Wysoczka  is a village in the administrative district of Gmina Buk, within Poznań County, Greater Poland Voivodeship, in west-central Poland.

In 2008, the village had a population of 300.

References

Villages in Poznań County